Hang Yuan Football Club (also spelled Hang Yuen) is a professional football club based in New Taipei, Taiwan that competes in the Taiwan Football Premier League. The club was previously known as Air Source Development and is currently affiliated with Fu Jen Catholic University. Hang Yuan was the first Taiwanese team to take part in the AFC Cup group stage.

History

Intercity Football League era
The club formed as Air Source Development FC and first entered the Intercity Football League in 2013. The club struggled in its early years, regularly having to play in qualification rounds in order to preserve its top flight status. In 2013, the club finished 7th of 8 teams, picking up only 7 points. Though it won the next season's qualification tournament, it still finished with the same points tally next season, albeit at an improved 6th place due to Chiayi County F.C. finishing rock bottom with 0 points. They avoided the preliminary round for the 2015–16 season, but it proved to be their least successful season yet, as they followed Chiayi County in finishing bottom of the table with 0 points.

Taiwan Football Premier League
For the newly revamped 2017 Taiwan Football Premier League, Air Source Development changed their name to Hang Yuan F.C. and enlisted the help of Fu Jen Catholic University to improve the team's standard. This saw an immediate improvement, as Hang Yuan finished 4th in the league phase of the new top-flight structure in Taiwan. This finish allowed them to compete in the 3rd place play-off against Hasus TSU F.C. Over two legs, Hang Yuan ran out 5-2 aggregate winners to finish 3rd in the inaugural TFPL season.

Due to the failures of Taipower and Tatung to obtain AFC Club Licences, Hang Yuan were granted Taiwan's place in the 2018 AFC Cup Group Stage, the first club from the country to do so. Signing Haiti international and former Major League Soccer midfielder Jean-Marc Alexandre, the team entered into a group with Benfica de Macau, and North Korean clubs April 25 Sports Club and Hwaebul. A close fought 3-2 defeat to Benfica de Macau was swiftly followed by a heavy 5-1 loss to April 25.

Current squad

Continental record

 Hang Yuan's score listed first

See also
Fu Jen Catholic University

External links
 Air Source Development FC logo 

2012 establishments in Taiwan
Football clubs in Taiwan
Association football clubs established in 2012
Works association football clubs in Taiwan